Tamer Salah may refer to:

Tamer Salah (footballer) (born 1986), Palestinian footballer
Tamer Bayoumi, or Tamer Salah Ali Abdu Bayoumi (born 1982), Egyptian taekwondo athlete and Olympian